Hans Schlange-Schöningen (November 17, 1886 – July 20, 1960) was a German politician of the Christian Democratic Union (CDU) and a member of the German Bundestag.

Life 
He was a member of the German Bundestag from its first election in 1949 until 9 June 1950.

Literature

References

1886 births
1960 deaths
Members of the Bundestag for Hesse
Members of the Bundestag 1949–1953
Members of the Bundestag for the Christian Democratic Union of Germany